"Ain't We Got Fun" is a popular foxtrot published in 1921 with music by Richard A. Whiting, lyrics by Raymond B. Egan and Gus Kahn.

It was first performed in 1920 in the Fanchon and Marco revue Satires of 1920, then moved into vaudeville and recordings. "Ain't We Got Fun?" and  its jaunty response to poverty and its promise of fun ("Every morning / Every evening," and "In the meantime, / In between time") have become symbolic of the Roaring Twenties, and it appears in some of the major literature of the decade, including The Great Gatsby by F. Scott Fitzgerald and in Dorothy Parker's award-winning short story of 1929, "Big Blonde." The song also contains variations on the phrase "The rich get richer and the poor get poorer" (substituting, e.g., "children" for "poorer"); though this phrase predates the song, its use increased with the song's popularity.

Composition
"Ain't We Got Fun" follows the structure of a foxtrot. The melody uses mainly quarter notes, and has an unsyncopated refrain made up largely of variations on a repeated four-note phrase. The Tin Pan Alley Song Encyclopedia describes it as a "Roaring Twenties favourite" and praises its vibrancy, "zesty music," and comic lyrics.

Philip Furia, connecting Kahn's lyrics to the song's music, writes that:

Critical appraisals vary regarding what view of poverty the song's lyrics take.
Nicholas E. Tawa summarizes the refrain "Ain't we got fun" as a "satirical and jaunty rejoinder" toward hard times. Diane Holloway and Bob Cheney, authors of American History in Song: Lyrics from 1900 to 1945, concur, and describe the black humor in the couple's relief that their poverty shields them from worrying about damage to their nonexistent Pierce Arrow luxury automobile.

Yet George Orwell highlights the lyrics of "Ain't We Got Fun" as an example of working class unrest:

After quoting a few of the song's lines Orwell refers to the era as a time when "people had not yet settled down to a lifetime of unemployment mitigated by endless cups of tea," a turn of phrase which the later writer Larry Portis contests.

However, others concentrate on the fun that they got. Stephen J. Whitfieldd, citing lyrics such as "Every morning / Every evening / Ain't we got fun," writes that the song "set the mood which is indelibly associated with the Roaring Twenties," a decade when pleasure was sought and found constantly, morning, evening, and "In the meantime / In between time." Philip Furia and Michael Lasser see implicit references to sexual intercourse in lyrics such as "the happy chappy, and his bride of only a year." Looked at in the context of the 1920s, an era of increasing sexual freedom, they point out that, while here presented within the context of marriage (in other songs it is not), the sexuality is notably closer to the surface than in previous eras and is presented as a delightful, youthful pleasure.

There are several variations on the lyrics. For example, American History in Song quotes the lyrics:

The sheet music published in 1921 by Jerome K. Remick and Co. leaves this chorus out completely, whereas a recording for Edison Records by Billy Jones keeps the reference to the Pierce Arrow, but then continues as in the sheet music: "There's nothing surer / The rich get rich and the poor get laid off / In the meantime,/ In between time/ Ain't we got fun?"

Reception and performance history
It premièred in the Fanchon and Marco show Satires of 1920, where it was sung by Arthur West, then entered the vaudeville repertoire of Ruth Roye. A hit recording by Van and Schenck increased its popularity, and grew into a popular standard.

The song appears in the F. Scott Fitzgerald novel The Great Gatsby, when Daisy Buchanan and Gatsby meet again after many years, and the latter insists Klipspringer, his apparently permanent "guest," to play it for them. It also appears in Dorothy Parker's 1929 short story, "Big Blonde." Warner Brothers used the song in two musicals during the early 1950s: The Gus Kahn biopic I'll See You in My Dreams and The Eddie Cantor Story. Woody Allen used the song in his 1983 film Zelig.

Notable recordings
 Van and Schenck (1921)
 Benson Orchestra of Chicago (1921)
 Billy Jones (1922)
 Margaret Whiting and Bob Hope (1949) (Margaret Whiting#Singles)
 Doris Day for her album By the Light of the Silvery Moon (1953)
 Gordon MacRae and June Hutton – for the Capitol Records EP By the Light of the Silvery Moon (1953)
 Alma Cogan – for her album I Love to Sing (1958)
 Peggy Lee for her album Jump for Joy (1959)
 Bing Crosby and Rosemary Clooney – recorded the song for their radio show in 1960 and it was subsequently released on CD.
 Renee Olstead for the Kit Kittredge: An American Girl soundtrack (2008)
 Charlie Hunter for his album Public Domain (2010)
 Elizabeth Gillies and Seth MacFarlane for her album Songs From Home (2020)

In popular culture
 The song was sung by an off-screen chorus during the title sequence and concluding scene in the 1950 comedy, The Jackpot starring James Stewart.
 The instrumental tune is heard at a party during a sequence set in the 1920s in the 1942 biopic, The Pride of the Yankees. Actress Teresa Wright sings part of the song's actual lyrics as well.
 The song was featured in the film By the Light of the Silvery Moon (1953), and performed by Doris Day and Gordon MacRae.  Day and MacRae also dance to it in On Moonlight Bay (1951)—anachronistically, since the movie is set during the First World War, before the song was written.
 British emo/post-hardcore band Baby Harp Seal's song "Eric Arthur Blair" incorporates lyrics from "Ain't We Got Fun?" as well as numerous references to George Orwell and The Road to Wigan Pier.
 It was used as a late 1970s commercial jingle for Little Friskies Cat Food.
 It appears in the film adaptation of the novel from 1974, The Great Gatsby, directed by Jack Clayton.
 "Ain't We Got Fun?" was used in season 3 of True Blood as Eric Northman's ring tone.
 Trixie Trotter sings the song in Episode 2 of Back to the Future: The Game.
 Mickey and Minnie Mouse perform this song on harmonica in the 1931 cartoon, Mickey Cuts Up.
 In "Surrender Benson," season 15, episode 1 of Law & Order: SVU, serial rapist/murderer William Lewis can be seen/heard singing along with the song as he drives down the road with a kidnapped Detective Olivia Benson in a drugged/alcoholic stupor on the floor of the back seat.
 The song was featured in the 1937 Merrie Melodies cartoon Ain't We Got Fun, as well as others released before and after that.
 The new Play-Doh Town commercials have a jingle set to this tune.
 The song was used and covered by actors in the independent film "Suffering Cassandra ".
 In season 2 of Jessica Jones, Jessica's mother Alisa plays the song on her grand piano until the crying of her neighbor's infant causes her to destroy the piano in a fit of rage. Jessica later finds sheet music for the song on a tablet when she finds the house.
 Robert Hartshorne composed an instrumental rendition of the song for Thomas and Friends. It can be heard in some episodes such as the eighth series episode, Thomas and the Circus.
 The song serves as the theme song and title of "Ain't We Got Fun?!", the upcoming madcap comedy from Repartee Pictures in 2023.
The song is heard in the 2016 film Better Watch Out.

References

1921 songs
Foxtrots
Songs with lyrics by Raymond B. Egan
Songs with lyrics by Gus Kahn
Doris Day songs
Songs with music by Richard A. Whiting